Sandon and Burston is a civil parish in the Borough of Stafford, Staffordshire, England. It contains 36 listed buildings that are recorded in the National Heritage List for England. Of these, one is listed at Grade I, the highest of the three grades, four are at Grade II*, the middle grade, and the others are at Grade II, the lowest grade.  The parish contains the villages of Sandon and Burston, and the surrounding countryside.  A major building in the parish is Sandon Hall, a country house which is listed together with associated structures and buildings in its grounds and estate.  The Trent and Mersey Canal passes through the parish, and two mileposts along its towpath are listed.  The other listed buildings include a church, houses and associated structures, cottages, farmhouses and farm buildings, a former railway station, a village club, and a public house.


Key

Buildings

References

Citations

Sources

Lists of listed buildings in Staffordshire